CBB can stand for:

 Camp B'nai Brith of Montreal, a Jewish summer camp near Lantier, Quebec
 Camp B'nai Brith of Ottawa, a Jewish summer camp near Quyon, Quebec
 Campeonato Brasileiro de Basquete
 Canterbury-Bankstown Bulldogs, an Australian rugby league team
 CBB, an indicator for a capacitor of the polypropylene film capacitor type
 CBB, the IATA code for Jórge Wilstermann International Airport in Cochabamba, Bolivia
 CBB, the National Rail code for Carbis Bay railway station, Cornwall, UK
 CBB, the pinyin railway code for Chibi North railway station, Hubei, China 
 CBB, the stock symbol for Cincinnati Bell on the New York Stock Exchange
 Central Bank of Bahrain
 Central Bank of Barbados
 Celebrity Big Brother, the title of many celebrity versions of reality television show Big Brother
 Celebrity Big Brother (UK), a British reality television show
 Chesapeake Bay Bridge, a bridge over the Chesapeake Bay in Maryland, United States
 Circular barbell, a design in body-piercing jewelry
 Colby-Bates-Bowdoin Consortium, an athletic association between Colby, Bates, and Bowdoin College in Maine
 Comedy Bang! Bang!, a podcast
 Comedy Bang! Bang! (TV series), a television adaptation
 Common Building Block, a cross-manufacturer set of standards for laptop components
 Connexion by Boeing, a mobile ISP formerly offered by Boeing
 Coomassie brilliant blue, a dye commonly used to stain proteins in certain gels
 Internet slang for "can't be bothered" and "could be better"